Alpha is the eighth studio album by the Christian metal band War of Ages. It was released on December 8th, 2017, and was produced by Jason Suecof (August Burns Red, All That Remains, Trivium). It is the first release by the band to not include drummer Alex Hamp, as he had left the group and was replaced by Alex Rüdinger as session drummer. The album displays more of a progressive metal influence than previous releases.

Track listing

Personnel
Credits adapted from AllMusic.
War of Ages
 Leroy Hamp – vocals
 Steve Brown – rhythm guitar, lead guitar
 Jack Daniels – rhythm guitar, lead guitar, bass, engineering, production

Additional personnel
 Jason Suecof – production, mixing, engineering
 Alex Rüdinger – drums
 Ashley White – backing vocals on "Warrior"
 Justin Aufdemkampe – vocal engineering
 Dave Quiggle – album artwork & design
 John Dougless – engineering 
 Mark Lewis – mastering
 Andy Cutrell – backing vocals

References

War of Ages albums
Facedown Records albums
2017 albums